

References

Discographies of British artists
Production discographies
Song recordings produced by S-X